Henry Meriton  (1762–1826) was an English sea captain who worked for the British East India Company (EIC). During his service he was involved in a famous shipwreck and three naval engagements.

Henry was born in Rotherhithe. He first went to sea as an apprentice sailing on John and Richard, which was involved in the slave trade. 

He was second mate on Halsewell, which foundered off Purbeck on 6 January 1786. He wrote an account of the shipwreck with John Rogers, Third Mate.

Meriton was captain of Exeter on her fourth voyage. It was this voyage that gave Meriton his order of rank in the EIC. His rank as commander dated from 16 October 1799, when he was given command of Exeter. 

It was on this voyage that Meriton participated in a notable naval action in which Meriton and Exeter captured a French frigate.

Meriton was still captain of Exeter on her fifth voyage when she participated in the Battle of Pulo Aura on 14 February 1804. A fleet of East Indiamen bluffed a French naval squadron into withdrawing, believing that the East Indiamen were a stronger British naval squadron.

After this voyage Meriton would go on to make several others for the EIC in different ships, with the result that in all he would hold the record of 12 voyages for the company.

This was his last voyage. He then served for a number of years as the Marine Superintendent for the EIC in Bombay.

He died in Greenwich on 7 August 1826.

Works
 (1786) A circumstantial narrative of the loss of the Halsewell, East-Indiaman ... Compiled from the communications ... of Mr. Henry Meriton and Mr. John Rogers London: William Lane

Citations and references
Citations

References
 
 
 

British East India Company
1762 births
1826 deaths
People from Rotherhithe
Sea captains